The 1953 Wyoming Cowboys football team was an American football team that represented the University of Wyoming as a member of the Skyline Conference during the 1953 college football season. In their first season under head coach Phil Dickens, the Cowboys compiled a 5–4–1 record (4–2–1 against Skyline opponents), finished third in the conference, and outscored opponents by a total of 195 to 110.

Schedule

References

Wyoming
Wyoming Cowboys football seasons
Wyoming Cowboys football